Barry Noel Cotter (born 4 December 1998) is an Irish professional footballer who plays as a right back for EFL League One club Barnsley.

Club career

Limerick
Cotter signed for Limerick in August 2015, having previously played for Avenue United and Ennis Town. He worked his way up through the youth system at Markets Field, and managed to break into the first team in 2017. He made 11 appearances during the 2017 League of Ireland season.

Ipswich Town
On 31 January 2018, Cotter signed a three and a half year deal with English Championship club Ipswich Town for an undisclosed fee. Although a member of Ipswich's under-23 squad, Cotter made his first team debut on 10 April 2018, in a 1–0 win over Barnsley at Portman Road. He made one further appearance during the 2017–18 season, appearing as a late substitute during a 4–0 win over Reading at the Madejski Stadium on 28 April 2018. Cotter left Ipswich on 22 March 2021 after being told he wouldn't be offered a new contract.

Chelmsford City (loan)
On 26 September 2019, Cotter signed for National League South club Chelmsford City on a one-month loan deal. He made his debut for the club in a 0–4 away win over Eastbourne Borough on 28 September. On 16 October 2020, Cotter returned to Chelmsford, on loan until 2 January 2021.

Shamrock Rovers
Cotter signed for League of Ireland Premier Division club Shamrock Rovers on 31 August 2021.
He scored his first goal for Shamrock Rovers against UCD on 19 May 2022.

St Patrick's Athletic (loan)
On 20 July 2022, Cotter signed for St Patrick's Athletic on loan until the end of the season.
He made his debut for the club a day later in a 1–1 draw with Slovenian side NŠ Mura in the UEFA Europa Conference League. On 29 August 2022, Cotter scored his first goal for the club in a 3–1 win away to Bohemians at Dalymount Park, picking up the ball on the half way line before beating 4 players on his way to finding the net to open the scoring in the 8th minute of the match. On 3 October 2022, he scored in a 4–4 draw away to rivals Shelbourne at Tolka Park.

Barnsley
On 18 January 2023, it was announced that Cotter had signed for EFL League One club Barnsley on a 3 and a half year deal for a fee in the region of £20,000.

International career
Cotter made his International debut for the Republic of Ireland U19 team on 10 February 2017, in a 2–1 loss to Norway. He won 2 caps for Ireland's under-19's in 2017.

He was called up to the Republic of Ireland U21 squad in March 2019, for a 2019 UEFA European Under-21 Championship qualifying match against Luxembourg. He was an unused substitute in the qualifier which took place on 24 March 2019 in Dublin, with Ireland emerging as 3–0 winners.

Career statistics

Honours
Shamrock Rovers
League of Ireland Premier Division: 2021
President of Ireland's Cup: 2022

References

External links
Barry Cotter at fai.ie

Barry Cotter at Soccerbase

1998 births
Living people
People from Ennis
People from County Clare
Republic of Ireland association footballers
Association football defenders
Limerick F.C. players
Ipswich Town F.C. players
Chelmsford City F.C. players
Shamrock Rovers F.C. players
St Patrick's Athletic F.C. players
Barnsley F.C. players
League of Ireland players
English Football League players
Republic of Ireland youth international footballers
Republic of Ireland expatriate association footballers
Irish expatriate sportspeople in England
Expatriate footballers in England
Black Irish sportspeople